Prince is a township in the Canadian province of Ontario, located within the Algoma District northwest of Sault Ste. Marie. Although the township is not part of the city of Sault Ste. Marie, some municipal services are contracted to the city.

The only named community within the township is Gros Cap. Most mail and telephone service in the township is part of Sault Ste. Marie's sortation area and telephone exchange.

Naturally spring fed, Princ
e Lake is a long-standing settlement for permanent residents and vacationers. In 2007, Tom Connelly was elected Mayor of the Lake and his son Kyle Connelly has served as the deputy, both by unanimous decision.

One of the largest wind farms in Canada, the Prince Township Wind Farm, is centred in Prince Township.  It provides enough electricity to serve 20,000 homes.  The project is run by Brascan Power Wind.

The township was named after John Prince, the first judge in the Algoma District.

Demographics 

Population trend:
 Population in 2016: 1,010
 Population in 2011: 1,031
 Population in 2006: 971
 Population in 2001: 1,010
 Population in 1996: 971
 Population in 1991: 987

See also
List of townships in Ontario

References

External links

Municipalities in Algoma District
Single-tier municipalities in Ontario
Township municipalities in Ontario